Paul Woods (born 17 January 1959) is a former speedway rider from England.

Speedway career 
Woods reached the final of the British Speedway Championship on two occasions in 1982 and 1983. He rode in the top tier of British Speedway from 1976–1992, riding for various clubs.

References 

1959 births
Living people
British speedway riders
Crayford Kestrels riders
Eastbourne Eagles riders
Ipswich Witches riders
King's Lynn Stars riders
Milton Keynes Knights riders
Rye House Rockets riders